Caleb Martin (born September 28, 1995) is an American professional basketball player for the Miami Heat of the National Basketball Association (NBA). He played college basketball for the NC State Wolfpack and the Nevada Wolf Pack. He is the twin brother of Cody Martin. He was named the Mountain West Conference Player of the Year for the 2017–18 season by the league's coaches.

High school career
Martin, a  small forward from Mocksville, North Carolina, played basketball for prep powerhouse Oak Hill Academy with twin brother Cody Martin. Prior to playing at Oak Hill, Caleb and his brother played three seasons at Davie County High School in Mocksville. He also played football his Freshman year of high school. The two committed to North Carolina State University to play for coach Mark Gottfried.

College career
As a sophomore, Martin averaged 11.5 points and 4.7 rebounds per game. Following that season, the Martin twins chose to transfer to Nevada to play for coach Eric Musselman. They thus would play for both the N.C. State Wolfpack and the Nevada Wolf Pack.

After sitting out the 2016–17 season due to NCAA transfer rules, Martin became eligible the following year. He averaged 19.5 points per game in his debut season, being named Mountain West Conference Player of the Year from the league's coaches and Newcomer of the Year from both coaches and league media. He shared Player of the Year honors with Boise State's Chandler Hutchison, who received the MW media version of the award. Martin led the Wolf Pack to a regular season conference championship and a Top 25 ranking. He and his brother then led the team to the 2018 NCAA tournament, where they advanced to the Sweet 16 after coming back from double-digits in wins over Texas and Cincinnati. After finishing out his junior season, Martin and his brother both tested out the 2018 NBA draft and were in the NBA Draft Combine that year, but both ultimately decided to return for their senior seasons.

Coming into his senior season, Martin was named Preseason Mountain West Player of the Year. Martin averaged 19.2 points per game, 5.1 rebounds, and 2.8 assists. He led Nevada to a 29–5 (15–3 MW) record. Martin’s college career ended with a loss in the First Round of the NCAA tournament to Florida 61–70. Martin was named to First-Team All Mountain West following the season along with fellow teammate Jordan Caroline.

Professional career

Charlotte Hornets (2019–2021)

After going undrafted in the 2019 NBA draft, Martin signed with the Charlotte Hornets on July 31, 2019. He joined his brother Cody, who was selected in the second round of the draft. On October 19, the Hornets converted Martin's contract into a two-way contract. Later the same day, he agreed to a multi-year deal with the Hornets and was converted to a standard deal. On October 25, Martin made his NBA debut, coming off the bench in a 99–121 loss to the Minnesota Timberwolves with four points, two rebounds, three assists, two blocks and a steal. On November 27, he received his first assignment to the Hornets NBA G League affiliate, the Greensboro Swarm. On March 9, 2020, Martin scored a season-high 23 points, alongside four assists, three steals and two blocks, in a 138–143 double overtime loss to the Atlanta Hawks.

On April 13, 2021, Martin scored a season-high 17 points, alongside ten rebounds and five assists, in a 93–101 loss to the Los Angeles Lakers. On May 4, he again scored 17 points, alongside five rebounds, two assists and two steals, in a 102–99 win over the Detroit Pistons.

On August 7, 2021, Martin was waived by the Hornets.

Miami Heat (2021–present) 
On September 14, 2021, Martin signed with the Miami Heat on a two-way contract, splitting time with the Sioux Falls Skyforce. He made his Heat debut on October 21, recording five points and two steals in a 137–95 win over the Milwaukee Bucks. On December 8, Martin scored a career-high 28 points, alongside eight rebounds, three assists and two steals, in a 113–104 win over the Bucks. On February 15, 2022, the Heat converted Martin's contract to a standard deal. During the playoffs, the Heat faced the Atlanta Hawks during their first round series. Martin made his playoff debut on April 17, scoring two points in a 115–91 Game 1 win. The Heat reached the Eastern Conference Finals, but were eliminated in seven games by the Boston Celtics.

On July 6, 2022, Martin re-signed with the Heat on a 3-year, $20 million deal. On October 22, 2022, during a 112–109 win over the Toronto Raptors, Martin was ejected after an altercation with Raptors center Christian Koloko. The next day, the NBA suspended Martin for one game without pay due to the altercation.

Career statistics

NBA

Regular season

|-
| style="text-align:left;"|
| style="text-align:left;"|Charlotte
| 18 || 1 || 17.6 || .440 || .541 || .810 || 2.1 || 1.3 || .7 || .4 || 6.2
|-
| style="text-align:left;"|
| style="text-align:left;"|Charlotte
| 53 || 3 || 15.4 || .375 || .248 || .641 || 2.7 || 1.3 || .7 || .2 || 5.0
|-
| style="text-align:left;"|
| style="text-align:left;"|Miami
| 60 || 12 || 22.9 || .507 || .413 || .763 || 3.8 || 1.1 || 1.0 || .5 || 9.2
|- class="sortbottom"
| style="text-align:center;" colspan="2"|Career
| 131 || 16 || 19.1 || .455 || .363 || .725 || 3.1 || 1.2 || .8 || .4 || 7.1

Playoffs

|-
| style="text-align:left;"|2022
| style="text-align:left;"|Miami
| 17 || 0 || 12.3 || .400 || .303 || .333 || 2.2 || .3 || .6 || .1 || 4.5
|- class="sortbottom"
| style="text-align:center;" colspan="2"|Career
| 17 || 0 || 12.3 || .400 || .303 || .333 || 2.2 || .3 || .6 || .1 || 4.5

College

|-
| style="text-align:left;"| 2014–15
| style="text-align:left;"| NC State
|| 36 || 1 || 16.6 || .356 || .305 || .695 || 2.9 || .7 || .3 || .3 || 4.8
|-
| style="text-align:left;"| 2015–16 
| style="text-align:left;"| NC State
|| 33 || 19 || 30.3 || .389 || .361 || .667 || 4.7 || 1.4 || .9 || .6 || 11.5
|-
| style="text-align:left;"| 2017–18 
| style="text-align:left;"| Nevada 
|| 36 || 26 || 33.3 || .454 || .403 || .749 || 5.4 || 2.6 || 1.3 || .6 || 18.9
|-
| style="text-align:left;"| 2018–19
| style="text-align:left;"| Nevada
|| 34 || 33 || 34.1 || .409 || .338 || .732 || 5.1 || 2.8 || 1.4 || .8 || 19.2
|- class="sortbottom"
| style="text-align:center;" colspan="2"| Career
|| 139 || 79 || 28.5 || .414 || .359 || .725 || 4.5 || 1.9 || 1.0 || .6 || 13.6

References

External links
Nevada Wolf Pack bio
NC State Wolfpack bio
College stats @ sports-reference.com

1995 births
Living people
American men's basketball players
Basketball players from North Carolina
Charlotte Hornets players
Greensboro Swarm players
Identical twins
Miami Heat players
NC State Wolfpack men's basketball players
Nevada Wolf Pack men's basketball players
People from Mocksville, North Carolina
Small forwards
American twins
Twin sportspeople
Undrafted National Basketball Association players